Ric Griffith is a Democratic member of the West Virginia House of Delegates for the 19th District, which encompasses part of Wayne County. He assumed office on December 1, 2020. His current term ends on November 30, 2022.

Early life and education
Griffith graduated from Ceredo-Kenova High School and received a degree from the University of Toledo College of Pharmacy.

Government service
Griffith served two terms as Kenova City Council President and two terms as Mayor of Kenova.

The Pumpkin House
Griffith is well known for displaying several thousand jack-o'-lanterns on his property each Halloween. Carving all the pumpkins is a community event, with around 20 dedicated volunteers helping. The pumpkin display is part of Ceredo-Kenova AutumnFest, a community-wide event which has a parade, scavenger hunt, and haunted trail. In 2019, he displayed over 3,000, one for every resident of his home town of Kenova, West Virginia.

During the COVID-19 pandemic, Griffith decided it was too risky to do the display at his home due to the large crowds that congregate to view it. He opted instead to have members of the community come by and pick up a pumpkin so it can be carved and displayed at their own homes. He created printed out instructions to go with each pumpkin to help the children and their families carve them.

References 

Democratic Party members of the West Virginia House of Delegates
Living people
Year of birth missing (living people)
University of Toledo alumni
People from Kenova, West Virginia